Ted Owens (1920-1987) was an alleged UFO contactee who claimed paranormal powers.

Life
Owens, who had a genius-level IQ and was a member of Mensa, believed he had been subject to "psychic surgery" by "space intelligences" who had operated on his brain to allow him to receive their telepathic messages. He considered himself a "UFO prophet" and compared himself with Moses, claiming psychokinetic powers that enabled him to not only predict but control lightning, hurricanes, tornadoes, earthquakes and volcanoes. Dubbing himself the "PK Man", Owens professed that his alleged powers were given to him by space intelligences who wished to call attention to the dangers that nuclear weapons and environmental pollution posed for mankind.

Science fiction and comic book writer Otto Binder wrote that Owens suffered a series of accidents resulting in brain trauma, which he felt were responsible for Owens supposed supernormal powers. Parapsychologist Jeffrey Mishlove wrote a book about Owens, The PK Man: A True Story of Mind Over Matter, with a foreword by John E. Mack.

References

Articles
How to Contact Space People, Ted Owens, Saucerian Press
How You Can Communicate with UFO Space Intelligences, Ted Owens, Saga Magazine
Flying Saucer Intelligences Speak, Ted Owens, Saucerian Press

External links
Sample Extracts from How To Contact Space People by Ted Owens
The PK Man: A True Story of Mind Over Matter by Jeffrey Mishlove .
On-line version of The Roots of Consciousness by Dr. Mishlove
Ted Owens: The Man Who Received Superpowers From Aliens

1920 births
1987 deaths
Contactees
Mensans
Psychokineticists